British Society of Criminology (BSC) is a leading international organizations aiming to further the interests and knowledge of both scholars and practitioners involved in any aspect of professional activity, teaching, research or public education related to crime, criminal behaviour and criminal justice systems in the United Kingdom and abroad. BSC is dedicated to promoting criminology and criminological research. Its official, peer-reviewed, scholarly journal is called Criminology and Criminal Justice (CCJ) and is published through SAGE Publications.

BSC has reciprocal agreements with a number of organisations, which include the following:
 British Sociological Association
 Australian and New Zealand Society of Criminology
 Social Policy Association
 Academy of Criminal Justice Sciences.
For members, this means they can attend the other organisations' events at reduced member rate, and vice versa.

List of presidents 
The following have served as President of the British Society of Criminology:

 1986 to 1989: Roger Hood
 1990 to 1993: David Farrington
 1993 to 1996: Robert Reiner
 1996 to 1999: Philip Bean
 2000 to 2003: Keith Bottomley
 2003 to 2005: Maureen Cain
 2005 to 2008: Tim Newburn
 2008 to 2011: Mike Hough
 2011 to 2015: Loraine Gelsthorpe
 2015 to 2019: Peter Squires
 2019 to present: Sandra Walklate

British Society of Criminology Annual Conference 
2018, 3-6 July, Birmingham City University
2017, 4-7 July, Sheffield Hallam University
 2016, 6-8 July, Nottingham
 2015, 30 June- 3 July, Plymouth University
 2014, 9-12 July, University of Liverpool
 2013, 2-4 July, University of Wolverhampton
 2012, 4–6 July, University of Portsmouth
 2011, 3–6 July, Northumbria University
 2010, 11–14 July, Leicester University
 2009, 29 June - 1 July, Cardiff University and University of Glamorgan
 2008, University of Huddersfield
 2007, London School of Economics
 2006, Glasgow
 2005, University of Leeds
 2004, University of Portsmouth
 2003, Bangor University
 2002, Keele University
 2000, Leicester University
 1999, University of Liverpool
 1997, Queen's University Belfast
 1995, Loughborough University
 1993, Cardiff University
 1991, University of York
 1989, Bristol Polytechnic
 1987, University of Sheffield

Outstanding Achievement Award
Winners:

 2009: Stanley Cohen
 2010: Pat Carlen
 2011: Robert Reiner
 2012: Jock Young
 2013: Joanna Shapland
 2014: Sandra Walklate
 2015: John Lea
 2016: Dick Hobbs
 2017: John Braithwaite
 2018: Frances Heidensohn

References

External links 
 British Society of Criminology

Criminology in the United Kingdom
Learned societies of the United Kingdom
Criminology
Criminology organizations